Rear Admiral Richard Frank Cheadle CB, DL (born 27 January 1950) is a former Royal Navy officer who went on to be Controller of the Navy.

Naval career
Cheadle served as director of nuclear propulsion at the Ministry of Defence and then as commander of HM Naval Base Devonport. Promoted to rear admiral, he was appointed chief of staff to the Second Sea Lord and Commander-in-Chief, Naval Home Command in 2003. He was appointed Controller of the Navy as well as an executive director of the Defence Procurement Agency in December 2003. By the following year he was still Controller of the Navy but also director, land & maritime. He retired from the navy in 2006 and became a director at WS Atkins.

Post-naval career
Cheadle is a Deputy Lord Lieutenant of Devon. Cheadle is also a councillor for the Buckland Monachorum ward of West Devon Borough Council. Cheadle sits as an independent.

References

1950 births
Living people
Royal Navy rear admirals
Companions of the Order of the Bath